Michael Feldman (born October 14, 1968) is an American public relations and communications consultant and a former Democratic political adviser. Feldman was Vice President Al Gore’s traveling chief of staff during the 2000 presidential election campaign. He is a founding partner and managing director of The Glover Park Group, a communications, consulting, and advocacy firm.

Biography
Born to a Jewish family, Feldman began his political career in the U.S. Senate serving first as a floor assistant in the Senate cloakroom, and then as a legislative analyst for the Senate Democratic Policy Committee. In 1991, Feldman took leave from the Senate to work on Sen. Harris Wofford’s special election campaign.

Feldman joined Bill Clinton's campaign staff in 1992. Following the election, Feldman served in the Clinton administration as Vice President Al Gore’s deputy director of legislative affairs from 1993 to 1997. In 1997 Feldman became senior adviser and traveling chief of staff to the Vice President, a role he held until 2001. In November 2000, Feldman played a key role in Gore's decision to contest the results of the presidential election. On election night Feldman helped pass news to Gore of the very small vote margin in Florida. Feldman, with fellow campaign officials Michael Whouley and Bill Daley, pressed Gore not to concede and to push for a recount.

In 2001, Feldman formed The Glover Park Group with Gore campaign advisers Carter Eskew and Chip Smith, and former White House Press Secretary Joe Lockhart. The Glover Park Group offers communications, government relations, corporate advocacy and crisis management services. Feldman is a managing director at the firm; he developed and currently leads its entertainment and environmental practices. In 2007, Feldman was part of a team at The Glover Park Group named Public Relations Professionals of the Year by the Public Relations Society of America for its work on Al Gore’s film, An Inconvenient Truth.

In an interview with lawyers Ben Chew and Camille Vasquez, in regard to the Depp v Heard defamation trial, Feldman's wife Savannah Guthrie revealed that Feldman had worked as a public relations consultant for the legal team representing Johnny Depp.

References

External links
 Profile on The Glover Park website

Living people
1968 births
American public relations people
20th-century American Jews
Clinton administration personnel
Tufts University alumni
Place of birth missing (living people)
21st-century American Jews